A Romano-Celtic temple (more specifically a Romano-British temple in Great Britain, or Gallo-Roman temple in the Continental region formerly comprising Gaul) is a sub-class of Roman temple found in the north-western provinces of the Roman Empire. Many may have had roots in the late Iron Age either in direct relation to pre-Roman structures or on sites with pre-Roman activity.

Layout
Each temple normally consisted of a box-like cella, of variable height, surrounded by an ambulatory or veranda built from stone, wood or both. This floor-plan is typically square or rectangular, but triangular, circular and polygonal layouts are also known. In size they vary considerably with the outer ambulatory ranging from 8.5m to 22m in length and the cella from 5.1m to 16m A central tower building, accessible from a door on one side, was usually roofed, as was the ambulatory, though the tower may rise above the height of the surrounding ambulatory or be pitched so that the two features join together. Some features of the Classical Roman temples are included in the architectural tradition of these temples, such as the addition of columns as part of the exterior wall; ambulatories may remain open or be delineated by a short wall or wall-and-colonnade.  The internal features included mosaic floors and decorative wall paintings. Structures often, but not without exception, stand within a temenos or sacred enclosure.

Religious function
Temples, as centres of religious ceremonies and festivals, may have attracted people from surrounding areas. Each temple would be dedicated to one or more gods, with a statue in the cella. Votive offerings such as coins, pottery, statues, miniature votive figurines can be found both within the building and in the surrounding ambulatory and temenos, suggesting that access may be available throughout the structure and that the external architectural components also serve a purpose within the ritual environment of the temple. The temple at Woodeaton produced evidence for multiple hearths within the temple superstructure, suggesting the use of fire within the religious worship at that site.

A priest would perform religious ceremonies within the temple or outside in the enclosure, although the exact daily role they played in Romano-Celtic temples is not well understood. Performing sacrifice, prayers, and overseeing festivals are key features of priesthoods in the Roman Empire. In Aquae Sulis (modern Bath, England), an altar was dedicated by a haruspex; this religious position may have been utilised elsewhere in Britannia. Fragments of priestly regalia have been found in British excavations: a copper alloy sceptre-cap from the temple at Farley, a chained headpiece or "crown" at Wanborough and a bronze crown with an adjustable band at Hockwold cum Wilton.

Distribution
They are, by far, the most frequently occurring type of temple in Roman Britain in place of the Classical Temple which are few in number: the Temple of Claudius in Colchester, the temple of Sulis-Minerva in Bath and the examples at Maryport,  Lincoln, Gloucester, and St.Albans are the only known examples.

Romano-Celtic temples occur across Britannia and are frequently associated with sites with recorded pre-Roman activity, such as at Jordan Hill. Temples may be associated with an extra-mural settlement near a fort, as at Vindolanda, or along a roadside. Prominent places within a landscape may also be chosen as sites for Romano-Celtic temples, for example the temple on top of the huge Iron Age Hillfort at Maiden Castle, Dorset or the temple on the coastal promontory at Brean Down, Somerset. The distribution of these temples covers both major and minor towns and includes rural sanctuaries. In towns they can occur as individual temples or in groups of two or more within an enclosure. At least seven have been identified at Camulodunum (Roman Colchester), several of which can be linked to certain deities by the statues and inscriptions found at the sites.

See also
Religion in ancient Rome
Roman Britain
Syncretism
Roman Temple

References

Bibliography
Lewis, M.J.T. 1966. Temples in Roman Britain (Cambridge Classical Studies). Cambridge: Cambridge University Press
Mukelroy, K. 1976. "Enclosed Ambulatories in Romano-Celtic Temples in Britain". Britannia Vol.7 pp173–191

External links
 Romano-Celtic Temple Typology

Ancient Roman temples